"Unchurched" (alternatively, "The Unchurched" or "unchurched people") means, in the broad sense, people who are Christians but not connected with a church. In research on religious participation, it refers more specifically to people who do not attend worship services. In this sense it differs slightly from the term 'nones' which denotes an absence of affiliation with a religion and not an absence of attendance at religious services. The Barna Group defines the term to mean "an adult (18 or older) who has not attended a Christian church service within the past six months" excluding special services such as Easter, Christmas, weddings or funerals. Barna reports that there were 75 million "unchurched people" in the United States as of 2004. Throughout history the word "unchurched" was a derogatory reference to people lacking access to culture or education or referred to inappropriate, improper or impolite behavior. It is no longer used this way.

Edward L. Ericson, a former member of the Joint Washington Office for Social Concerns, defines "unchurched" as anyone who refuses to join a religious organization "out of principle".

See also

 Church attendance
 Nominal Christian
 Unchurched Belt

References 

Christian terminology